Mah Meri, also known as Besisi, Cellate, Hma’ Btsisi’, Ma’ Betisek, and “Orang Sabat” (pejorative term), is an Austroasiatic language spoken in the Malay Peninsula. Along with Semaq Beri, Semelai and Temoq, Mah Meri belongs to the Southern Aslian branch of the Aslian languages. Mah Meri is the only remaining Aslian language spoken in a coastal area (on the coasts of Negeri Sembilan and Selangor) and its speaker population is 3,675 as recorded at the Orang Asli Museum in Gombak. A dictionary of the Mah Meri language has been compiled by Nicole Kruspe.

Phonology

Vowels

Voice Register 
There are two voice registers in Mah Meri: 
Register 1: Register 1 vowels have a clear tense voice quality, shorter duration and lower pitch. Register 1 vowels also have fewer phonotactic restrictions. 
Register 2: Register 2 vowels are laxer, longer and higher in pitch. Register 2 vowels also have a slight breathy voicing.

Consonants

Grammar

Syntax
In Mah Meri, modifiers and demonstratives occur after the head as shown in examples (1) and (2) while prepositions occur before the head as shown in example (3).

For transitive clauses, Mah Meri generally follows an Agent-Verb-Object (AVO) order as shown in example (4), but a Verb-Agent-Object (VAO) order is more common during natural discourse as shown in example (5).

For intransitive clauses in Mah Meri, both Subject-Verb (SV) and Verb-Subject (VS) orders are possible as shown in examples (6) and (7) respectively.

Morphology
Morphology in Mah Meri is exclusively through prefixation and infixation.

Semi-productive derivations

1. Detransitivizing N- 'DTR  
The prefix n- is attached to monosyllabic verbs and the vowel from the final syllable is reduplicated into the vowel position. 
Example:  bɛ 'to do' → nɛ-bɛ 'doing, doer' 
For disyllabic verbs, the initial consonant is replaced by a homorganic nasal.
Example:  plɘt 'to extinguish' → m:ɘlɘt 'extinguishing' 

2. Transitive focus ka- 'TR''' 
The prefix ka- only applies to indigenous monosyllabic verbs. 
Example: jɛt 'to follow' → ka-jɛt 'to follow someone or something', cɔʔ 'to go' → ka-cɔʔ 'to go to someone or a place' 

3. Distributive < l > 'DISTR 
The infix < l > applies to disyllabic intransitive verbs of position or state and also some verbs of motion. 
The infix is inserted into the initial syllable and a schwa replaces to well to correct syllable structure. 
Example: kancɛw 'to be naked' → kɘlancɛw 'many naked (people)'.
If the penultimate syllable CV is a palatal stop plus schwa, the < la > infix is applied instead. 
Example: jɘkɘʔ 'to sit motionless' → jɘ-la-kɘʔ'' 'many sitting motionless'

Regular productive derivations

Iterative sɘ-RDP-root 'ITER'
The prefix  is attached to the initial constituent of reduplicated bases to express iteration.
Example:  (ITER-RDP-that) 'that one over and over again'

Happenstance  'happ'
The prefix  expresses:
an inadvertent event
ability or inability when used in a negated clause.
Example:  'happen to eat'

Middle voice bɘ- 'MID'
The prefix  is applied to either verbal or nominal roots to express an attributive or possessive function.
Example:   'having a house'

Language Endangerment and Vitality
According to Ethnologue, the language status of Mah Meri is '6b: Threatened', referring to the situation whereby the language is used for face-to-face communications within all generations, but is losing users. This status is based on Lewis and Smino's (2010) Expanded Graded Intergenerational Disruption Scale (EGIDS).

A study by Coluzzi, Riget & Wang (2017) on language use and attitudes across 4 different Mah Meri villages on Carey Island suggests that while Mah Meri still holds a strong and positive status in the community, there is a possibility of a complete language shift towards Malay in the future due to lesser usage of Mah Meri amongst the younger generation.

References

External links 
 http://projekt.ht.lu.se/rwaai RWAAI (Repository and Workspace for Austroasiatic Intangible Heritage)
 http://hdl.handle.net/10050/00-0000-0000-0003-66E2-7@view Mah Meri in RWAAI Digital Archive
 ELAR archive of Mah Meri (and Ceq Wong) language documentation materials

Languages of Malaysia
Aslian languages